Joseph N'Singa Udjuu Ongwabeki Untubwe (29 September 1934 – 24 February 2021) was a Congolese politician. He served as the First State Commissioner of Zaire from 23 April 1981 to 5 November 1982. From 1966 to 1969, he also served as Minister of Justice.

References

Government ministers of the Democratic Republic of the Congo
People from Mai-Ndombe Province
1934 births
2021 deaths